The 1970 Georgia Tech Yellow Jackets football team represented the Georgia Institute of Technology in the 1970 NCAA University Division football season. The Yellow Jackets were led by fourth-year head coach Bud Carson and played their home games at Grant Field in Atlanta.

Georgia Tech started the year with four straight victories, climbing to 13th in the AP Poll. Two losses to ranked rivals Tennessee and Auburn knocked them out of the polls. After racking up three more wins, they traveled to Notre Dame and almost pulled off an upset over the #1 team in the country, as the Fighting Irish needed a fourth-quarter comeback to beat the Yellow Jackets. The close loss actually brought Georgia Tech back into the polls, at 16th. After defeating rival Georgia, they were invited to the 1970 Sun Bowl, where they defeated Texas Tech, 17–9.

Schedule

Source:

Roster

References

Georgia Tech
Georgia Tech Yellow Jackets football seasons
Sun Bowl champion seasons
Georgia Tech Yellow Jackets football